Isodontia mexicana, the Mexican grass-carrying wasp, is a species of insect belonging to the family Sphecidae. It is mainly found throughout North America, but has become established in Europe, primarily France, Switzerland, Hungary, Italy, Serbia, and Spain.

They can be encountered from early Summer through September. Females are larger and emerge as adults later in the season than males.

Isodontia mexicana is a typical case of a species arrived accidentally from North America and slowly encroaching on the European continent, probably for the lack of predators or parasites.

These wasps build their nests in hollowed branches or in other natural cavities, often reusing the nests of other species. Then they line the inside with grass fragments or other plant fibers (hence the name of 'Grass-carrying wasps').

I. mexicana mainly preys on grasshoppers (usually katydids, Tettigoniidae species) or Tree crickets (Gryllidae species), choosing the small ones and carrying them to its nest to feed the emerging larvae with the living, but paralyzed Orthoptera.

References
 Kevin M. O'Neill and Ruth P. O'Neill - Sex Allocation, Nests, and Prey in the Grass-Carrying Wasp Isodontia mexicana (Saussure) (Hymenoptera: Sphecidae) - Journal of the Kansas Entomological Society - Vol. 76, No. 3 (Jul., 2003), pp. 447–454.
 Kevin M. O'Neill, James F. O'Neill, Ruth P. O'Neill -  - Sublethal effect of brood parasitism on the grass-carrying wasp Isodontia mexicana - Ecological Entomology - Volume 32, Issue 1, pages 123–127, February 2007
 Scaramozzino, P.L., Currado I., Vergano G., Tromellini C., 1991. Nesting behaviour of adventive Isodontia mexicana (Saussure) in Piedmont (Italy North-West) (Hymenoptera Sphecidae). Ethology Ecology & Evolution, Special Issue 1: 39-42.

External links
 Biolib
 Fauna Europaea
 Ento.psu.edu

Sphecidae
Insects described in 1867
Hymenoptera of Europe